Zero Point is a 2014 Estonian drama film directed by Mihkel Ulk.

Cast 
 Märt Pius - Johannes
 Saara Kadak - Bianka
 Tambet Tuisk - Gunnar Post
 Mari Abel - Ege
 Christopher Rajaveer (:et) - Mihkel
 Liis Lindmaa - Riina
 Reimo Sagor - Bert
 Henrik Kalmet - Esko
 Taavi Teplenkov - Literature teacher
 Külliki Saldre - Teacher Irina
 Kärt Tomingas - Teacher Pille
 Kärt Tammjärv - Kreete
 Raimo Pass - Johannes' Father
 Ingmar Jõela - Raimo
 Aleksander Eeri Laupmaa - Karmo
 Brigitte Susanne Hunt - Paula (:et)

References

External links 

2014 drama films
Estonian drama films